The 2019–20 UEFA Europa League knockout phase began on 20 February with the round of 32 and ended on 21 August 2020 with the final at RheinEnergieStadion in Cologne, Germany, to decide the champions of the 2019–20 UEFA Europa League. A total of 32 teams competed in the knockout phase.

Times are CET/CEST, as listed by UEFA (local times, if different, are in parentheses).

Qualified teams
The knockout phase involved 32 teams: the 24 teams which qualified as winners and runners-up of each of the twelve groups in the group stage, and the eight third-placed teams from the Champions League group stage.

Europa League group stage winners and runners-up

Champions League group stage third-placed teams

Format
Each tie in the knockout phase, apart from the final, was played over two legs, with each team playing one leg at home. The team that scored more goals on aggregate over the two legs advanced to the next round. If the aggregate score was level, the away goals rule was applied, i.e. the team that scored more goals away from home over the two legs advanced. If away goals were also equal, then extra time was played. The away goals rule was again applied after extra time, i.e. if there were goals scored during extra time and the aggregate score was still level, the visiting team advanced by virtue of more away goals scored. If no goals were scored during extra time, the winners were decided by a penalty shoot-out. In the final, which was played as a single match, if the score was level at the end of normal time, extra time was played, followed by a penalty shoot-out if the score was still level.

The mechanism of the draws for each round was as follows:
In the draw for the round of 32, the twelve group winners and the four third-placed teams from the Champions League group stage with the better group records were seeded, and the twelve group runners-up and the other four third-placed teams from the Champions League group stage were unseeded. The seeded teams were drawn against the unseeded teams, with the seeded teams hosting the second leg. Teams from the same group or the same association could not be drawn against each other.
In the draws for the round of 16, quarter-finals and semi-finals, there were no seedings, and teams from the same group or the same association could be drawn against each other. As the draws for the quarter-finals and semi-finals were held together before the quarter-finals were played, the identity of the quarter-final winners was not known at the time of the semi-final draw. A draw was also held to determine which semi-final winner was designated as the "home" team for the final (for administrative purposes as it was played at a neutral venue).

On 17 June 2020, UEFA announced that due to the COVID-19 pandemic in Europe, the final stages of the competition would feature a format change. The quarter-finals, semi-finals and final would be played in a single-leg format from 10 to 21 August 2020 in the German cities of Cologne, Düsseldorf, Duisburg and Gelsenkirchen. The matches were tentatively played behind closed doors, though spectators could be allowed subject to a review of the situation and the decisions of the national and local government.

Following the competition restart in August 2020, a maximum of five substitutions were allowed, with a sixth allowed in extra time. However, each team was only given three opportunities to make substitutions, with a fourth opportunity in extra time, excluding substitutions made at half-time, before the start of extra time and at half-time in extra time. This followed a proposal from FIFA and approval by IFAB to lessen the impact of fixture congestion.

In the knockout phase, teams from the same or nearby cities (e.g., Porto and Braga) were not scheduled to play at home on the same day, due to logistics and crowd control. To avoid such scheduling conflict, an adjustment had to be made by UEFA. For the round of 32, since both teams were drawn to play at home for the second leg, the home match of the team which were not domestic cup champions in the qualifying season, or the team with the lower domestic ranking (if neither team were the domestic cup champions, e.g. Braga for this season), were moved from Thursday to Wednesday. For the round of 16, quarter-finals and semi-finals, if the two teams were drawn to play at home for the same leg, the order of legs of the tie involving the team which were not domestic cup champions in the qualifying season, or the team with the lower domestic ranking, was reversed from the original draw.

Schedule
The schedule was as follows (all draws are held at the UEFA headquarters in Nyon, Switzerland).

Following the round of 16 first legs, the competition was postponed indefinitely due to the COVID-19 pandemic in Europe. The final, originally scheduled to take place on 27 May 2020, was officially postponed on 23 March 2020. A working group was set up by UEFA to decide the calendar of the remainder of the season.

Matches could also be played on Tuesdays or Wednesdays instead of the regular Thursdays due to scheduling conflicts.

Bracket

Round of 32

The draw for the round of 32 was held on 16 December 2019, 13:00 CET.

Summary

The first legs were played on 20 February, and the second legs were played on 26, 27 and 28 February 2020.

|}

Matches

Wolverhampton Wanderers won 6–3 on aggregate.

İstanbul Başakşehir won 5–4 on aggregate.

Getafe won 3–2 on aggregate.

Bayer Leverkusen won 5–2 on aggregate.

Copenhagen won 4–2 on aggregate.

Basel won 4–0 on aggregate.

1–1 on aggregate. Sevilla won on away goals.

2–2 on aggregate. Olympiacos won on away goals.

LASK won 3–1 on aggregate.

Manchester United won 6–1 on aggregate.

Inter Milan won 4–1 on aggregate.

Eintracht Frankfurt won 6–3 on aggregate.

Shakhtar Donetsk won 5–4 on aggregate.

VfL Wolfsburg won 5–1 on aggregate.

Roma won 2–1 on aggregate.

Rangers won 4–2 on aggregate.

Round of 16

The draw for the round of 16 was held on 28 February 2020, 13:00 CET.

Summary

Six of the eight first leg matches were played on 12 March, while the remaining first legs and all second leg fixtures were postponed by UEFA due to concerns over the COVID-19 pandemic in Europe. On 17 June 2020, UEFA announced that the second legs would be played on 5–6 August 2020. In July 2020, they confirmed that the second legs would be played at the home team's stadium as normal. For the two ties that had not played their first legs, the matches were instead played in a single-leg format, at neutral venues in Germany.

||colspan="2" rowspan="2" 

|}

Matches

Copenhagen won 3–1 on aggregate.

Wolverhampton Wanderers won 2–1 on aggregate.

Bayer Leverkusen won 4–1 on aggregate.

Shakhtar Donetsk won 5–1 on aggregate.

Basel won 4–0 on aggregate.

Manchester United won 7–1 on aggregate.

Quarter-finals

The draw for the quarter-finals took place on 10 July 2020.

Summary

The matches were played on 10 and 11 August 2020.

|}

Matches

Semi-finals

The draw for the semi-finals took place on 10 July 2020 (after the quarter-final draw).

Summary

The matches were played on 16 and 17 August 2020.

|}

Matches

Final

The final was played at the RheinEnergieStadion in Cologne. The "home" team (for administrative purposes) was determined by an additional draw held after the quarter-final and semi-final draws.

Notes

References

External links

3
February 2020 sports events in Europe
March 2020 sports events in Europe
August 2020 sports events in Europe
Association football events postponed due to the COVID-19 pandemic
UEFA Europa League knockout phases